The 2021 Oxfordshire County Council election took place on 6 May 2021 alongside the other local elections. All 63 seats of the Oxfordshire County Council were contested. The council is composed of 61 divisions, each electing either one or two councillors, all elected by FPTP.

Since the last election in 2017, there had been some changes in seat composition. In April 2018, Cllr. Pete Handley was suspended from the Conservatives after calling another councillor a derogatory term. In November 2019, there was a by-election to replace the outgoing Independent councillor in Wallingford; Dr Pete Sudbury of the Green Party won the ensuing contest, providing the party representation after being wiped out at the last election. Three other Conservative councillors resigned the whip and became independents.

The elections took place at the same time as the Thames Valley Police and Crime Commissioner Election, which was due to have been held in 2020, but was delayed by the COVID-19 pandemic.

Although initial counts suggested the Conservatives were on 22 seats, and Labour on 15, there were errors in the Banbury Ruscote division where the Labour vote was mistaken for the Conservative vote and vice versa; this was successfully challenged in the High Court by Labour, and so the final result is 21 seats for the Conservatives and 16 for Labour.

Summary

Election result

|-

Aftermath 

The Conservatives suffered big losses in the election, including the County Council leader Ian Hudspeth. The Liberal Democrats, Labour and Greens formed a coalition after the election, therefore ousting the Conservatives for the first time since the Council's formation in 1973.

Previously, from '01-'05 the Conservatives had governed in coalition with the Liberal Democrats, '05-'13 in a majority and since '13 working with independent councillors.

Initially, the newly minted leader of the Conservative group proposed a coalition with Labour alongside the one remaining independent councillor, Les Sibley, and Stefan Gawrysiak of the Henley Residents Group. Cllr. Reeves said: "If you look at two things: council tax and the approach to housing and growth, there is actually far more, if we are honest, in common between Labour and the Conservatives than between Lib Dems and Conservatives."

At the same time, talks continued between the Liberal Democrats and the Labour groups. While the Liberal Democrats also formed an alliance with the Green group to form a single group on the council, which will hold 24 councillors.

Eventually, later in May, it was revealed that the Liberal Democrat, Labour and Green councillors had formed an agreement, termed "The Oxfordshire Fair Deal Alliance" which would run the council in a coalition.

The new leader of the council will be Cllr. Liz Leffman (Lib Dem) while the deputy leader will be Cllr. Liz Brighouse (Labour). The cabinet will be split between four Liberal Democrats, three Labour and one Green councillor. The new Chair of the county council will be Cllr. John Howson (Lib Dem) with the Vice-Chair being Cllr. Susannah Pressel (Labour).

Results by division

Cherwell

Oxford

South Oxfordshire

Vale of White Horse

West Oxfordshire

By-elections

Rose Hill and Littlemore

References 

Oxfordshire County Council elections
2021 English local elections
2020s in Oxfordshire